Companhia Cinematográfica Vera Cruz was an important Brazilian film studio founded in 1949 and closed in 1954. Located in São Bernardo do Campo, it was created by the industrialists Franco Zampari and Francisco Matarazzo Sobrinho. The company produced and coproduced more than 40 feature films, including O Cangaceiro, one of the most successful movies in Brazilian cinema's history.

Films 

 Painel - 1950 - short documentary directed por Lima Barreto
 Santuário - 1950 - short documentary directed by Lima Barreto
 Caiçara - 1950 - feature film directed by Adolfo Celi
 Ângela - 1951 - feature film directed by Abílio Pereira de Almeida and Tom Payne
 Terra é sempre terra - 1951 - feature film directed by Tom Payne
  - 1952 - feature film directed by Fernando de Barros
 Veneno - 1952 - feature film directed by Gianni Pons
 Tico-tico no Fubá - 1952 - feature film directed by Adolfo Celi
 Sai da frente - 1952 - feature film directed by Abílio Pereira de Almeida
 Nadando em dinheiro - 1952 - feature film directed by Abílio Pereira de Almeida and Carlos Thiré
 Sinhá Moça - 1953 - feature film directed by Tom Payne
 A Família Lero-Lero - 1953 - feature film directed by Alberto Pieralise and Gustavo Nonnemberg
 O Cangaceiro - 1953 - feature film directed by Luciano Salce
 Uma Pulga na Balança - 1953 - feature film directed by Luciano Salce
 - 1953 - feature film directed by Ruggero Jacobbi
 Luz apagada - 1953 - feature film directed by Carlos Thiré
 Obras Novas - 1953 - short documentary about new installations in the Vera Cruz's studios
  - 1954 - feature film directed by Ugo Lombardi
  - 1954 - feature film directed by Flaminio Bollini Cerri
  - 1954 - feature film directed by Abílio Pereira de Almeida
  - 1954 - feature film directed by Luciano Salce
  - 1954 - full-length documentary directed by Lima Barreto

References

Film production companies of Brazil